Ballyadams is a barony in County Laois (formerly called Queen's County or County Leix), Republic of Ireland.

Etymology
Ballyadams barony is named after Ballyadams Castle, a 15th-century fortified house near Ballylynan.

Geography
Ballyadams is located in the east of the county, north of the River Douglas and west of the River Barrow (where it forms part of the border with County Kildare). It is a limestone region, with some anthracite coal being mined in the past.

History
Ancient chiefs in the area include the Uí Caollaidhe (Keely), who  were chiefs of Críoch Uí mBuidhe. 

It is referred to in the topographical poem Tuilleadh feasa ar Éirinn óigh (Giolla na Naomh Ó hUidhrín, d. 1420): 
Críoch Ó mBuidhe an fhóid fhinntigh
ós Bearbha mbuig mbraoinlinntigh;d’Ó Chaolluidhe as caomh an chríoch,aoghoire nár fhaomh eissíoth''
("Crioch O-mbuidhe of the fair sod, Along the Barrow of the bright pools, To O'Caollaidhe the territory is fair, A shepherd prepared to encounter enemies.")

The Uí Caollaidhe were expelled during the Laois-Offaly Plantation of the 16th century, and took land at Kylenabehy. Ballyadams went to the Bowen family, including Robert Bowen (High Sheriff of Queen's County 1579) and Lucy Bowen (wife of William Southwell).

List of settlements

Below is a list of settlements in Ballyadams barony:
Ballylinan
Barrowhouse, County Laois

References

Baronies of County Laois